Jules Melquiond (born 19 August 1941) is a former French alpine skier.

Career
During his career he has achieved 4 results among the top 10 (2 podiums) in the World Cup.

World Cup results
Top 10

References

External links
 
 

1941 births
Living people
French male alpine skiers